Alexander Shand may refer to:

 Alexander Shand, 1st Baron Shand (1828–1904), Scottish advocate and judge
 Alexander Faulkner Shand (1858–1936), English writer and barrister
 Alexander Shand (ethnologist) (1840–1910), New Zealand farmer, interpreter and ethnographer
 Alexander Shand (barrister) (1865–1949), Australian barrister
 Alexander Innes Shand (1832–1907), Scottish barrister and author